George Semple (c. 1700 – 13 April 1782) was a notable Irish builder and architect.

Life
His earliest known work is the steeple,  in height, of St. Patrick's Cathedral, Dublin, which he designed and erected in 1749.

He also built St Patrick's Hospital (1749–57), which was founded in 1747 with money bequeathed by Jonathan Swift following his death in 1745.

His best known work was Essex Bridge across the River Liffey (now Grattan Bridge). This was begun in 1752, and completed in 1754, and was considered one of the best bridges in Ireland. The government awarded him £500 for his efforts. Essex Bridge was taken down in 1872 and replaced by the present Grattan Bridge, leading from Parliament Street to Capel Street. Semple later wrote a book, Treatise on Building in Water, first published in 1776, which was based on this project.

He constructed Headfort in the 1760s for Sir Thomas Taylour, later 1st Earl of Bective (1724–1795) (see Marquess of Headfort). It lies above the River Blackwater, a tributary of the River Boyne, just outside the early ecclesiastical town of Kells in the northwest of County Meath.

In 1777 Semple was living in Queen Street, Dublin, where he died late in 1781 or early in 1782.

References

Attribution

1700 births
1782 deaths
Architects from Dublin (city)
18th-century Irish architects